Seyed Javad Mowla is an Iranian neuroscientist and molecular biologist. He obtained his Ph.D degree in 2001 in the field of Neuroscience from McGill University, Montreal, Canada. He is currently an associate professor and the head of Department of Molecular Genetics at Tarbiat Modares University, Tehran, Iran. He has published more than 100 peer-review papers in international journals which cited more than 2500 times. His fields of study includes Neural Cancer Biology, Cancer Stem Cells and microRNAs.

References

Living people
McGill University Faculty of Science alumni
Iranian neuroscientists
Year of birth missing (living people)